Carmen Casteiner, married Cagnotto (born 27 September 1954) is a retired Italian diver.

She was born in Bolzano. Casteiner finished nineteenth in the 10 metre platform event of the 1976 Olympic Games.

She is the wife of Giorgio Cagnotto and mother of Tania Cagnotto.

References

Italian female divers
1954 births
Living people
Sportspeople from Bolzano
Divers at the 1976 Summer Olympics
Olympic divers of Italy